Elstree South (usually just Elstree on Underground maps) was a proposed London Underground station in Elstree, Hertfordshire. It was designed by Charles Holden. The planned location of the station was adjacent to the A5183, north of the junction with the A41 and where junction 4 of the M1 motorway was subsequently built.

History

Planning and construction

The station was the second of three planned by London Passenger Transport Board (LPTB) in 1935 for an extension of the Northern line from Edgware to Bushey Heath. There was debate about the name for the station, with Elstree Hill and Elstree being proposed.

The extension was part of the Northern Heights project which was intended to electrify a number of steam-operated London and North Eastern Railway (LNER) branch lines and to incorporate them into the Northern line. Much of the land for the extension came from the purchase in 1922 by the LPTB's precursor, the Underground Electric Railways Company of London, of the unbuilt Watford and Edgware Railway (W&ER). The W&ER had planned an extension of the Edgware, Highgate and London Railway to Watford Junction via Bushey, but it had never raised the capital required and its powers to construct a line had expired in 1911. The specific route to Bushey Heath was approved by parliament in October 1937. The LPTB's principal purpose for the extension to Elstree was to stimulate the development of new residential areas to increase passenger numbers. A secondary purpose was to provide a location suitable for a large new depot that was required to accommodate and maintain the new fleet of 1938 Stock trains to be used across the existing Northern line and the lines taken over from the LNER.

Immediately north of the station were the junctions to the depot and a pair of depot sidings would have occupied the station cutting on the south side. The station building, designed by Charles Holden, would have had a statue of a Roman Centurion at one end reflecting, inspired by the nearby site of the Roman settlement of Sulloniacae.

Construction works on the Northern Heights project began in the late 1930s but were interrupted by the outbreak of the Second World War. Most of the work undertaken to that date had been carried out on the existing LNER branch tracks but work between Edgware and Bushey Heath had started in June 1939. The route of the line had been cleared and laid out and some earthworks and tunnelling carried out between Edgware and Elstree South.

Following the outbreak of war in Europe, work on the extension was suspended in September 1939 and was formally terminated in December of the same year as wartime funding restrictions would prevent completion. During the war years, the LPTB-owned land was used for farming vegetables for staff canteens.

Cancellation
The sites of all three new stations were in semi-rural locations and, as it had elsewhere, it was intended that the opening of the new section of Underground line would stimulate the construction of new residential estates that the stations would then serve. After the war, new legislation was introduced to limit the continuing expansion of urban areas into their surrounding countryside. This legislation created the Metropolitan Green Belt around London and the area designated included the area covered by the new Northern line extension. Without the possibility of constructing the new housing estates, the new line had no purpose and the plans for the extension were cancelled in 1950. 

The tunnelling shields were removed in 1949 and the tunnels sealed. The entrances were finally buried in the 1960s when the M1 motorway was constructed and today nothing is visible on the surface.

See also
 Edgware, Highgate and London Railway - LNER branch line taken over by London Underground as part of the Northern Heights project

Notes and references

Notes

References

Bibliography

External links
 Abandoned Tube Stations - Northern Heights: Edgware - Bushey Heath

Hertsmere
Rail transport in Hertfordshire
Proposed London Underground stations
Unbuilt Northern Heights extension stations
Charles Holden railway stations